Dr. Chunyuan Liao is the founder and CEO of HiScene, a Chinese image recognition and augmented reality technology provider he began in 2012. Liao is part of the Chinese government's "Thousand Talents Plan".

Education 
Liao received his B.S. and Ph.D. degrees from Tsinghua University, China, and the University of Maryland, respectively.

Career 
Before founding HiScene, Dr. Liao was a research scientist at Fuji Xerox Palo Alto Laboratory in Silicon Valley, California.

References

Living people
Chinese chief executives
People's Republic of China science writers
21st-century Chinese businesspeople
People from Zhaotong
Businesspeople from Yunnan
Writers from Yunnan
Year of birth missing (living people)